Jemyma Betrian (born ) is a Curaçaoan-born Dutch female kickboxer and boxer, based in Oosterhout, Netherlands. She competes professionally since 2005 and is the former WBC Muay Thai Bantamweight champion and mixed martial artist.

Between November 2016 and May 2018 she was ranked in the top ten pound for pound women in the world by Combat Press. As of April 2020, she is the #2 Super Bantamweight in the world by WBC Muaythai.

Career
Betrian made had her professional fight in 2005 against Marouska Pruynboom. She lost a unanimous decision.

In 2007, she scored a TKO win over Suheyla Ozturk to win the MON Women's Dutch Flyweight title.

In 2010, Betrian defeated Christine Toledo to win WBC Muaythai Women's International Super Flyweight title.

During The Battle of Rotterdam Rebels 7, she defeated Linda Ooms to win the WFCA K-1 rules Women's European Bantamweight title.

Betrian challenged Tiffany van Soest for the IKKC Muaythai Women's World Super Bantamweight title. She failed to win the title, as the fight ended in a draw.

She defended the WBC Muaythai Women's World Bantamweight title, with a 30 second KO of Marcela Soto.

In her next fight, she won the IMTU Women's European Bantamweight title with a TKO win over Katia Semail, as Katia retired after the second round.

She defeated Thais Souza by third-round TKO at WCK Muay Thai: Matter of Pride in Temecula, California on February 15, 2014, to win the WKC Muaythai Women's World Bantamweight title.

During Kunlun Fight 3, she won a unanimous decision against E Meidie to win the WLF 52kg Women's World Championship title.

She knocked out Christi Brereton in round two at WCK Muay Thai: International Showdown in Temecula, California on June 7, 2014, to retain the WBC Muaythai Women's World Bantamweight title.

Titles

Professional
2014 WLF 52 kg Women's World Championship
2014 WKC Muaythai Women's World Bantamweight title
2013 IMTU Women's European Bantamweight Championship
2012 WBC Muaythai Women's World Bantamweight Championship (2 title defenses)
2010 WBC Muaythai Women's  International Super Flyweight Championship
2010 WFCA K-1 rules Women's European Bantamweight Championship
2007 MON Women's Dutch Flyweight Championship

Amateur
2007 IFMA World Muaythai Championships in Bangkok, Thailand  -54 kg

Kickboxing record 

|-  style="background:#fbb;"
|-
|-  style="background:#fbb;"
| 2016-08-06 || Loss ||align=left| Gong Yanli || Glory Of Heroes 4 || Changzhi, China || KO (Spinning Back fist) || 3 || 2:59  || 
|-
|-  bgcolor="#CCFFCC"
| 2015-02-10 || Win ||align=left| Chandra Engel || Fight Night || Studio City, California, USA || KO || 1 ||  ||
|-
|-
! style=background:white colspan=9 |
|-
|-  bgcolor="#CCFFCC"
| 2014-06-07 || Win ||align=left| Christi Brereton || WCK Muay Thai: International Showdown || Temecula, California, USA || KO || 2 ||  || 35-2-1
|-
|-
! style=background:white colspan=9 |
|-
|-  bgcolor="#CCFFCC"
| 2014-03-30 || Win ||align=left| E Meidie || Kunlun Fight 3, Final || Harbin, China || Decision (Unanimous) || 3 || 3:00 || 34-2-1
|-
! style=background:white colspan=9 |
|-  bgcolor="#CCFFCC"
| 2014-03-30 || Win ||align=left| Anisa Mackeson || Kunlun Fight 3, Semi-Final || Harbin, China || TKO || 1 || 0:10 || 33-2-1
|-
|-  bgcolor="#CCFFCC"
| 2014-02-15 || Win ||align=left| Thais Souza || WCK Muay Thai: Matter of Pride || Temecula, California, USA ||TKO ||3 ||  || 32-2-1
|-
! style=background:white colspan=9 |
|-
|-  bgcolor="#CCFFCC"
| 2014-01-18 || Win ||align=left| Wang Kehan || Wu Lin Feng || Hubei, China || Ext R. Decision (Unanimous)  || 4 || 3:00 || 31-2-1
|-
|-  bgcolor="#CCFFCC"
| 2013-11-23 || Win ||align=left| Katia Semail ||  || Riom, France || TKO (Corner stoppage)  || 2 ||  || 30-2-1
|-
! style=background:white colspan=9 |
|-
|-  bgcolor="#CCFFCC"
| 2013-04-06 || Win ||align=left| Marcela Soto || Bad to the Bone || Las Vegas, United States || KO  || 1 || 0:30 || 29-2-1
|-
! style=background:white colspan=9 |
|-
|-  bgcolor="#CCFFCC"
| 2012-11-11 || Win ||align=left| Tiana Caverly ||  || Las Vegas, United States || Decision (unanimous) || 5 || 3:00 ||   
|-
! style=background:white colspan=9 |
|-
|- style="background:#c5d2ea;"
| 2012-08-18 || Draw ||align=left| Tiffany van Soest || WCK Muay Thai: Nakamoto vs. Kitchen  || Pala, California, USA || Draw (majority) || 5 || 3:00 || 
|-
! style=background:white colspan=9 |
|-
|-  bgcolor="#CCFFCC"
| 2012-05-20 || Win ||align=left| Ayano Oish ||  || Nagoya, Japan || TKO || 2 ||  ||
|-
|-  bgcolor="#CCFFCC"
| 2012-02-12 || Win ||align=left| Mariela Kruse ||  ||  || Decision ||  ||  ||
|-
|-  bgcolor="#CCFFCC"
| 2011-12-23 || Win ||align=left| Lorena Klijn || Klaar om te Bossen IV || Paramaribo, Surinam || Decision ||  ||  ||
|-
|-  bgcolor="#CCFFCC"
| 2011-11-12 || Win ||align=left| Mellony Geugjes ||  || Philipsburg, Sint Maarten || Decision ||  ||  ||
|-
|-  bgcolor="#CCFFCC"
| 2011-10-09 || Win ||align=left| Nevenka Mikulic || Muaythai Premier League || Padova, Italy || Decision || 3 || 3:00 ||
|-
|-  bgcolor="#CCFFCC"
| 2010-11-06 || Win ||align=left| Linda Ooms ||  The Battle of Rotterdam Rebels 7 || Rotterdam, Netherlands || KO || 2 ||  ||
|-
|-
! style=background:white colspan=9 |
|-
|-  bgcolor="#CCFFCC"
| 2010-10-09 || Win ||align=left| Liuba Mockeviciene ||  || Russia || KO || 1 ||  ||
|-
|-  bgcolor="#CCFFCC"
| 2010-04-17 || Win ||align=left| Christine Toledo || WCK Muay Thai || Primm, Nevada, USA || Decision (unanimous) || 5 || 3:00 ||
|-
|-
! style=background:white colspan=9 |
|-
|-  bgcolor="#CCFFCC"
| 2010-03-07 || Win ||align=left| Adriane Marksteiner ||  || Nijmegen, Netherlands || Decision ||  ||  ||
|-
|-  bgcolor="#CCFFCC"
| 2009-11-24 || Win ||align=left| Mariela Kruse ||  || Nijmegen, Netherlands || Decision ||  ||  ||
|-
|-  bgcolor="#CCFFCC"
| 2009-02-01 || Win ||align=left| Lisa Scheaffers ||  || Nijmegen, Netherlands || TKO ||  ||  ||
|-
|-  bgcolor="#CCFFCC"
| 2008-06-29 || Win ||align=left| Chadia Azzaoui ||  || Amsterdam, Netherlands || Decision ||  ||  ||
|-
|-  bgcolor="#CCFFCC"
| 2008-03-16 || Win ||align=left| Priscilla Vergouwen ||  || Wijchen, Netherlands || Decision ||  ||  ||
|-
|-  style="background:#fbb;"
| 2007-12-04 || Loss ||align=left| Karla Benitez || IFMA 2007 World Muaythai Championships, Finals || Bangkok, Thailand || ||  ||  ||
|-
|-
! style=background:white colspan=9 |
|-
|-  bgcolor="#CCFFCC"
| 2007-12-03 || Win ||align=left| Lim Su-Jeong || IFMA 2007 World Muaythai Championships, Semi Finals || Bangkok, Thailand || ||  ||  ||
|-
|-  bgcolor="#CCFFCC"
| 2007-12-01 || Win ||align=left|  || IFMA 2007 World Muaythai Championships, Quarter Finals || Bangkok, Thailand || ||  ||  ||
|-
|-  bgcolor="#CCFFCC"
| 2007-10-27 || Win ||align=left| Merve ||  || Turkey || ||  ||  ||
|-
|-  bgcolor="#CCFFCC"
| 2007-09-23 || Win ||align=left| Noortje de Swart ||  || Eindhoven, Netherlands || TKO ||  ||  ||
|-
|-  bgcolor="#CCFFCC"
| 2007-04-07 || Win ||align=left| Suheyla Ozturk || The Art of Muaythai, Finals || Apeldoorn, Netherlands || TKO ||  ||  ||
|-
|-
! style=background:white colspan=9 |
|-
|-  bgcolor="#CCFFCC"
| 2007-04-07 || Win ||align=left| Elmas Ulusoy || The Art of Muaythai, Semi Finals || Apeldoorn, Netherlands || TKO ||  ||  ||
|-
|-  bgcolor="#CCFFCC"
| 2007-02-04 || Win ||align=left| Angel Alvarez ||  || Eindhoven, Netherlands || TKO ||  ||  ||
|-
|-  bgcolor="#CCFFCC"
| 2006-12-10 || Win ||align=left| Rania ||  || Den Bosch, Netherlands || Decision ||  ||  ||
|-
|-  bgcolor="#CCFFCC"
| 2006-11-19 || Win ||align=left| Marouska Pruynboom ||  || Deventer, Netherlands || Decision ||  ||  ||
|-
|-  bgcolor="#CCFFCC"
| 2006-10-14 || Win ||align=left| Linda Willems ||  || Deventer, Netherlands || TKO  ||  ||  ||
|-
|-  bgcolor="#CCFFCC"
| 2006-05-27 || Win ||align=left| Marouska Pruynboom ||  || Tilburg, Netherlands || Decision  ||  ||  ||  
|-
|-  style="background:#fbb;"
| 2005-11-27 || Loss ||align=left| Marouska Pruynboom ||  || Valkenswaard, Netherlands || Decision  ||  ||  ||  
|-
|-
| colspan=9 | Legend:

Mixed martial arts record

|Win
|align=center|2–0
|Chandra Engel
|KO (Head Kick)
|The Sportsmen's Lodge
|
|align=center|1
|align=center|4:03
|Studio City, Los Angeles
|
|-
|Win
|align=center|1–0
|Hadley Griffith
|KO (Punches)
|LOP - Chaos at the Casino 5
|
|align=center|1
|align=center|0:47
|Los Angeles, United States
|

See also
List of female kickboxers

References

External links
 Jemyma Betrian at Awakening Fighters

1991 births
Living people
AIBA Women's World Boxing Championships medalists
Curaçao female kickboxers
Dutch female kickboxers
Bantamweight kickboxers
Strawweight mixed martial artists
Mixed martial artists utilizing boxing
Mixed martial artists utilizing Muay Thai
Mixed martial artists utilizing kickboxing
Dutch female mixed martial artists
Dutch Muay Thai practitioners
Female Muay Thai practitioners
People from Santa Rosa, Curaçao
Kunlun Fight kickboxers
Dutch women boxers
Boxers at the 2019 European Games
European Games medalists in boxing
European Games bronze medalists for the Netherlands